Milton Jerome Mack (born September 20, 1963 in Jackson, Mississippi) was an American football cornerback in the NFL for the New Orleans Saints, Tampa Bay Buccaneers, and the Detroit Lions.  He played college football at Alcorn State University.

1963 births
Living people
American football cornerbacks
Alcorn State Braves football players
New Orleans Saints players
Tampa Bay Buccaneers players
Detroit Lions players
Players of American football from Jackson, Mississippi
National Football League replacement players